Charles Spencer, 3rd Duke of Marlborough,  (22 November 170620 October 1758), styled as The Honourable Charles Spencer between 1706 and 1729 and as The Earl of Sunderland between 1729 and 1733, was a British soldier, nobleman, and politician from the Spencer family. He briefly served as Lord Privy Seal in 1755. He led British forces during the Raid on St Malo in 1758.

Early life

He was the second son of Charles Spencer, 3rd Earl of Sunderland, and Lady Anne Churchill, the second daughter of John Churchill, 1st Duke of Marlborough, and his wife Sarah Churchill, Duchess of Marlborough. He inherited the Sunderland title from his older brother in 1729, becoming 5th Earl of Sunderland, and then the Marlborough title from his aunt Henrietta, 2nd Duchess of Marlborough in 1733. At that time, he handed over the Sunderland estates to his younger brother John, but he did not obtain Blenheim Palace until Sarah, the dowager duchess, died in 1744.

On Thursday, 14 July 1737, Marlborough captained his own cricket team in a match against the Prince of Wales' XI on Kew Green. Wales' XI are known to have won the match which was apparently of minor standard although publicised because of the participants. This is the only known mention of Marlborough in a cricketing connection.

He was one of the original governors of London's Foundling Hospital, the foundation of which in 1739 marked a watershed in British child care advocacy and attitudes.

Seven Years War

He is best known for his service in the early part of the Seven Years' War. He led the Raid on St Malo, a naval descent against the French coastal port. Following the Capture of Emden in 1758, he led the British expeditionary force sent to join Ferdinand of Brunswick's Army of Observation on Continental Europe, but died the same year, leaving command to John Manners, Marquess of Granby.

Marriage and children
He married The Hon. Elizabeth Trevor (c. 17131761), daughter of Thomas Trevor, 2nd Baron Trevor. They had five children:

Lady Diana Spencer (1734–1808). Married first Frederick St John, 2nd Viscount Bolingbroke, and secondly Topham Beauclerk.
Elizabeth Herbert, Countess of Pembroke and Montgomery (29 December 173730 April 1831). Married Henry Herbert, 10th Earl of Pembroke.
George Spencer, 4th Duke of Marlborough (26 January 173929 January 1817).
Lord Charles Spencer (31 March 174016 June 1820).
Lord Robert Spencer (8 May 174723 June 1831)

Personal life
The amiable Charles was generally well-liked, and he was a loyal husband and loving father. He made sure to write to his wife frequently while on military campaigns and always sent his love to their children. He had no concept of economy, and was a heavy spender. He was so notoriously incompetent with money that when he suddenly died in 1758, acquaintances wryly remarked that he died before he could spend his heir's inheritance on the estate.

Death
In October 1758, Charles was on a campaign in Germany when he caught dysentery that was sweeping the camp. His sudden death shocked his family, friends, and England. However, an autopsy revealed he would have died not long after, as his lungs were ravaged by the consumption that had killed his mother and sister. Surprisingly, Charles did not spread consumption to his children.

Titles

22 November 1706 – 15 September 1729: The Honourable Charles Spencer
15 September 1729 – 24 October 1733: The Right Honourable The Earl of Sunderland
24 October 1733 – 20 October 1758: His Grace The Duke of Marlborough

Ancestry

References

External Sources 

 

|-

|-

1706 births
1758 deaths
1st The Royal Dragoons officers
British Army generals
British Life Guards officers
Coldstream Guards officers
Charles Spencer, 3rd Duke of Marlborough
103
Knights of the Garter
Lord-Lieutenants of Buckinghamshire
Lord-Lieutenants of Oxfordshire
Lords Privy Seal
Members of the Privy Council of Great Britain
Fellows of the Royal Society
Cricket patrons
Freemasons of the Premier Grand Lodge of England
18th-century philanthropists